The Cossack and the Nightingale (German: Der Kosak und die Nachtigall) is a 1935 Austrian romantic thriller film directed by Phil Jutzi and starring Jarmila Novotna, Iván Petrovich and Gerda Maurus. The film's art direction was by Julius von Borsody.

Cast
 Jarmila Novotna as Vera Starschenska, Sängerin 
 Iván Petrovich as Gregor Ogolenski  
 Gerda Maurus as Sonja Lubinskaja, called 'B27'  
 Rudolf Klein-Rogge as Dschahid-Bey, Tabakgroßhändler 
 Herbert Hübner as Dr. Frederik Hammersvelt  
 Siegfried Schürenberg as Herr von Tremoliere  
 Erich Fiedler as Stanley Shrimp, Maler 
 Alexa von Porembsky as Nina, Vera's Maid  
 Rudolf Carl as Andruschna, Diener bei Ogolenski  
 Fritz Imhoff as Kienhäusl, Veras Impresario  
 Franz Schafheitlin as R 12  
 Mihail Xantho as Dschahid Beys Sekretär

References

Bibliography 
 Bock, Hans-Michael & Bergfelder, Tim. The Concise CineGraph. Encyclopedia of German Cinema. Berghahn Books, 2009.

External links 
 

1935 films
1930s spy films
1930s thriller films
Austrian thriller films
Austrian musical films
1930s German-language films
Films directed by Phil Jutzi
Films set in Egypt
Films based on Austrian novels
Universal Pictures films
Austrian black-and-white films
Austrian romantic musical films
1930s romantic musical films